Black Blade is a thriller novel written by Eric Van Lustbader.  It was published in 1992.

Plot summary

In New York City, a series of murders begin. In Washington, a plot conceived at the highest levels of American government is at work to bring the nation of Japan to its knees. In Tokyo, a power struggle is nearing its final stages for control of the Black Blade Society, an ostensibly political cabal whose motives may encompass far more than politics.

Editions
Black Blade: A Novel (paperback), Fawcett Crest Books,

References

1992 American novels
American thriller novels
HarperCollins books
Novels by Eric Van Lustbader